Frederick Mark Gedicks (born May 17, 1953) is an expert on religion and law, especially the role of religion in public life.  He is a professor of law at the J. Reuben Clark Law School at Brigham Young University (BYU).

Biography 

Gedicks received his bachelor's degree in economics from BYU.  He then earned his JD from the University of Southern California.

Gedicks is a full-fledged supporter of the Religious Freedom Restoration Act, and has condemned the Rehnquist Court for not placing any limits on government power.

Gedicks has written two books.  One is The Rhetoric of Church and State: A Critical Analysis of Religious Law Jurisprudence. (Durham: Duke University Press, 1995).  The other is Choosing the Dream: The future of Religion in American Public Life written with Roger Hendrix.

Gedicks is an active Latter-day Saint.

Gedicks rejects the use of the government to promote religion.

Gedicks currently holds the Guy Anderson Chair at the J. Reuben Clark Law School.

Notes

Sources 
 
 "Public Life and Hostility to Religion" by Frederick Mark Gedicks in Virginia Law Review, Vol. 78, No. 3 (Apr., 1992), pp. 671–696, author intro.

1953 births
Latter Day Saints from Utah
Brigham Young University alumni
Brigham Young University faculty
Living people
USC Gould School of Law alumni
Latter Day Saints from California